was a Japanese record producer from Hiroshima. He was based in Kyoto. He was one half of the duo Yanokami along with Akiko Yano.

Biography
Rei Harakami released his debut EP, titled Rei Harakami EP, in 1997. His first studio album, Unrest, was released in 1998. It was followed by Opa*q (1999), Red Curb (2001), and Lust (2005).

He died of a brain hemorrhage on 27 July 2011.

Discography

Studio albums
 Unrest (1998)
 Opa*q (1999)
 Red Curb (2001)
 Lust (2005)
 Wasuremono (2006)
 The World of Kawagoe Rendezvous (2011)

Compilation albums
 Wide world (1990–1991)
 Small world: rei harakami selected works 1991–1993 (1991–1993)
 Trace of Red Curb (2001)
 Colors of the Dark (2006) 
 Asage: Selected Re-Mix & Re-Arrangement Works 1 (2009)
 Yūge: Selected Re-Mix & Re-Arrangement Works 2 (2009)

Soundtrack albums
 Tennen Kokekkō (2007)

EPs
 Rei Harakami EP (1997)
 November EP (1998)
 Blind / Swap EP (2000)
 Joy for Joy EP (2005)
 Evaporater EP (2006)

Singles
 "Red Curb Again" (2001)

References

External links
 

1970 births
2011 deaths
Japanese electronic musicians
Musicians from Hiroshima Prefecture
20th-century Japanese musicians